Club Rápido de Bouzas is a Spanish football team based in Bouzas, parish of Vigo, in the autonomous community of Galicia. Founded in 1914 it currently plays in Tercera División RFEF – Group 1, holding home games at Estadio Baltasar Pujales, which has a capacity of 2,500 spectators.

History
After playing their entire history between Tercera División and the Galician regional leagues, Rápido de Bouzas was promoted for the first time ever to Segunda División B on 25 June 2017. Their debut was quite successful, as the club finished 5th among 20 teams. 

In the 2018–19 season the club finished 17th and was relegated back to Tercera. On 13 June 2019, Miguel Fernández was appointed the manager of Rápido.

Season to season

2 seasons in Segunda División B
23 seasons in Tercera División
1 season in Tercera División RFEF

Honours
Tercera División: 2004–05

Current squad

References

External links
Official website 
Futbolme team profile 
Estadios de España 

Football clubs in Galicia (Spain)
Association football clubs established in 1917
1917 establishments in Spain